The Lower Saxony Cup is an annual football cup competition, held by the  since 1956. For sponsorship reasons, the official name of the competition is Krombacher-Pokal. The Krombacher brewery, sponsor of the competition since 2010, also sponsored, at the time, the cup competitions in Thuringia, Westphalia, Hesse and Rhineland. It is one of the 21 regional cup competitions in Germany and a qualifying competition for the German Cup, with the winner and runners-up of the competition being automatically qualified for the first round of the German Cup in the following season.

The record winners of the competition are Sportfreunde Salzgitter with four titles, followed by Kickers Emden, VfL Wolfsburg, and Hannover 96 with three titles each to their name.

Mode
The competition is open for all member clubs of the Lower Saxony FA playing in the 3. Liga, Regionalliga Nord and Niedersachsenliga. Additionally, the four regional cup winners in the state are also qualified. Reserve teams are not permitted to compete anymore. Regardless of which club has been drawn first, clubs from a lower league will always have home advantage when playing a club from a higher league. In case of a draw after regular time, no extra time is played and the game instead decided by a penalty shoot out. The two cup finalists automatically qualify for the first round of the German Cup.

Winners
The winners of the competition:

 ‡ Won by reserve team.
 1 Known as Sportfreunde Lebenstedt before 1964.
 No competition held in 1979.

References

Sources
Deutschlands Fußball in Zahlen,  An annual publication with tables and results from the Bundesliga to Verbandsliga/Landesliga, publisher: DSFS

External links
NFV – Lower Saxony football association 
Official DFB results website 

Recurring sporting events established in 1956
Football cup competitions in Germany
Football competitions in Lower Saxony
1956 establishments in West Germany